Pan Yu (28 October 1924 in Hangzhou, China – 11 January 2015 in Guangzhou), was a Chinese actress and play director. When Pan was 14 years old, she started her career as actress of local drama club. In 1946, Pan joined the China Dance Drama Society, and toured Malaysia. For critical acclaimed performance in Live in Peace and Contentment (1997), she won a Golden Rooster Award, a Golden Goblet Award and a Huabiao Award.

Selected filmography

Film

Theater

References

External links

1924 births
2015 deaths
Chinese film actresses
Chinese theatre directors